Adventures in Africa is a series of Warner Bros. documentary film shorts inspired by the success of Martin and Osa Johnson and concurrent features such as Africa Speaks! and Trader Horn.

Premise
Wynant D. Hubbard (1900-1961), the author of several books on the continent and its wildlife, spent several months in 1929-1930 in Rhodesia with his wife and two children and cameraman W. Earle Frank assisting. Funding was partly provided by the American Geographic Society. The chronicle of his adventures, with recorded sound adding to the authenticity, was edited from an estimated 103,000 feet of footage and proved to be a popular summertime theatrical series in 1931.

The studio later reedited the footage into a feature called Untamed Africa that was released on April 8, 1933 by Warner Bros. under the Vitagraph mark. Hubbard returned to Africa and it is possible that this additional footage was included in the feature but not in the original shorts.

Use as educational materials
As with several other Warner Bros. short-film series, these black-and-white films enjoyed a second life as educational material for public schools until they were supplanted in the 1950s by newer African travelogues in color. ridicule of other races and the few hunting scenes are for village meat, not trophies.)

In July 2011, the Warner Archive Collection released the film on DVD along with Kongo (1932). The UCLA film archive maintains a group of the original short films.

Episodes
The original titles of the shorts, with dates indicating The Film Daily previews:
 Into the Unknown / 15 minutes / May 17, 1931 (premier date; several films copyrighted on April 13) / features a fight between a lion and a hyena
 An African Boma / 10 minutes / June 21 / focuses on village life
 The Lion Hunt / 15 minutes / July 5
 Spears of Death / 14 minutes / July 5 
 Trails of the Hunted / 18 minutes / July 19 / includes wildebeest, baboons, and a number of pets adopted by the Hubbard children
 The Buffalo Stampede / 17 minutes / August 9
 The Witch Doctor's Magic / 10 minutes / September 6 / Hubbard and his assistants aid a tribe “scaring to death” lechwe for food without any weapons involved
 Flaming Jungles / 13 minutes / September / a brush fire almost destroys their lodgings
 Dangerous Trails / 15 minutes / September 27 / scenes of hippopotamus and crocodiles
 Maneaters / 17 minutes / September 27 / a lion attacking cattle is hunted down
 Beasts of the Wilderness / 12 minutes / October 25 / antelope herds featured
 Unconquered Africa / 16 minutes / November 8 / mostly a recap

See also
List of short subjects by Hollywood studio#Warner Brothers

Notes

External links
Wynant D. Hubbard on IMDb.com
Film Daily links
UCLA record of first film

References
 Liebman, Roy Vitaphone Films – A Catalogue of the Features and Shorts 2003 McFarland & Company
 Motion Pictures 1912-1939 Catalog of Copyright Entries 1951 Library of Congress

Black-and-white documentary films
American short documentary films
Films shot in Africa
Warner Bros. short films